Emerald Hill, also known as Eagle's Nest, is a historic mansion in Clarksville, Tennessee, U.S.. It was built in 1830. The owner, Thomas W. Frazer, donated it to his niece, Marion McClure, the wife of Confederate Senator Gustavus Adolphus Henry Sr., in the 1840s. It was purchased by the Austin Peay State University Alumni Association in 1975.

The house was designed in the Greek Revival architectural style. It has been listed on the National Register of Historic Places since July 14, 1971.

References

National Register of Historic Places in Montgomery County, Tennessee
Greek Revival architecture in Tennessee
Houses completed in 1830
Austin Peay State University